Hamilton Community Center & Ice Arena, formerly named Hamilton Ice Arena, is a year-round indoor arena and recreational sport facility in Columbus, Indiana. It features one NHL size sheet of ice for hockey, figure skating, speed skating, broomball, and open skating and one studio size sheet of ice, totalling  of ice. Originally an outdoor facility, Hamilton Ice Arena was designed by Harry Weese and built in 1958.

The building is chalet style, with coarse materials and a triple-beamed roof. In 1975, a continuation of the structures was added to enclose and expand the skating area to a regulation size hockey rink and adjoining practice area. Skaters from beginners to competitive enjoy this top-notch facility. In 2015, Hamilton was renovated to restore some of the original components in a $2.8 million project.

Hamilton Community Center & Ice Arena is currently the home rink for the Columbus Icemen high school hockey team and the Columbus Flames youth hockey teams. Additionally, Lincoln Center Skate Club, Full Throttle Speedskating, Columbus Broomball Association, and Columbus Parks and Recreation use the facility. Hockey Hall of Fame inductees Wayne Gretzky, Gordie Howe, and Bobby Hull have all made visits to Hamilton.

References

External links
Official Hamilton Community Center & Ice Arena website

Indoor arenas in Indiana
Indoor ice hockey venues in the United States
Sports venues in Indiana
Columbus, Indiana
Modernist architecture in Indiana
Harry Weese buildings
Ice hockey venues in Indiana